

Abstract 
Bangasternus orientalis is a species of true weevil known as the yellow starthistle bud weevil. It is used as an agent of biological pest control against the noxious weed yellow starthistle (Centaurea solstitialis).

The adult weevil is brown with a thin coat of light mottled hairs. It is about 6 millimeters long. The female lays up to 470 eggs near the flower heads of yellow starthistle and glues them with a dark-colored mucilage. When the larva emerges from its egg, it tunnels up into the flower head, where it consumes the flower parts and developing seeds. It then constructs a sort of cocoon from the remnants of the flower and seed parts and pupates there. Most of the damage to the plant is done by the larva, which destroys 50-60% of the seeds in a given flower head. It is host-specific, attacking only yellow starthistle and sometimes purple starthistle (C. calcitrapa); it does not attack any native plants.

This weevil is native to southern Europe and the Mediterranean. It was first released as a biocontrol agent in the United States in 1985. It is now established throughout the western United States, wherever yellow starthistle is found. It helps prevent the spread of the weed, but it is not as common or effective as other yellow starthistle biocontrol agents.

The efficacy of Bangasternus orientalis Capiomont against its host Centaurea solstitialis L. was determined at two different sites (low and high elevation) in California over a 2-yr period.
Host plant and weevil phenology were delayed at the high elevation site. Consequently, the initiation of secondary flower buds (high elevation site) was extended well into November, long after the ovipositing adult weevil population had expired.  More than 50% of the egg-bearing test heads did not become infested with mature pupae because of larval mortality. After seed reduction by the weevil, 70% of the seeds remained in the test heads. Our data suggest that B. orientalis appears to be ineffective by itself as a biological control agent of yellow starthistle in California.

Life Cycle 
Overwintering adults appear on plants in the spring through early summer. Eggs are laid on young leaves under developing flower heads. Larvae hatch, tunnel into the stem, and ultimately into the flower head, where they feed on young seeds. Pupation occurs within the seed heads. New adults then exit the plant to overwinter.

Habitat 
Spotted and diffuse knapweed are weed species that can be found throughout the northern tier of states and as far south as Nebraska and Virginia. These highly competitive weed species favor and establish quickly on disturbed sites and overgrazed rangeland. Both weeds will invade well established grassland communities and out compete the native vegetation. The release of B. fausti is part of a program to introduce a complex of spotted and diffuse knapweed enemies to help control these weeds.

Field Identification 
Several insects have been released for control of yellow starthistle.  B. orientalis can be distinguished from the other seed head beetles, Eustenopus villosus and Larinus curtus, by its much shorter and blunt snout.  B. orientalis also has much shorter body hairs than E. villosus.

Pests Attacked 
B. fausti is considered host specific and limited to a few species in the genus Centaurea, specifically C. diffusa (diffuse knapweed), C. maculosa (spotted knapweed), C. calcitrapa (purple star-thistle), C. squarrosa (squarrose knapweed), and will rarely attack C. solstitialis (yellow star- thistle), all of which are introduced weeds. Extensive host specificity tests were conducted in the field and laboratory in Europe before B. fausti was cleared and released in the United States.

Availability 
This beetle is readily available wherever yellow starthistle is found.  Adults can be collected from spring through early summer. However, because its impacts are usually secondary relative to E. villosus, and because it is likely already present at most starthistle sites, redistribution may be unnecessary.

References 

 Coombs, E. M., et al., Eds. (2004). Biological Control of Invasive Plants in the United States. Corvallis: Oregon State University Press, 423.

External links 
 USACE Biocontrol Profile
 invasive.org Biology of Yellow Starthistle

Molytinae
Insects used for control of invasive plants
Biological pest control beetles
Beetles described in 1873